A Baire one star function is a type of function studied in real analysis. A function  is in class Baire* one, written , and is called a Baire one star function, if for each perfect set , there is an open interval , such that  is nonempty, and the restriction  is continuous. The notion seems to have originated with B. Kirchheim in an article titled 'Baire one star functions' (Real Anal. Exch. 18 (1992/93), 385-399).
The terminology is actually due to Richard O'Malley,  'Baire* 1, Darboux functions' Proc. Amer. Math. Soc. 60 (1976) 187-192.  The concept itself (under a different name) goes back at least to 1951. See H. W. Ellis, 'Darboux properties and applications to nonabsolutely convergent integrals' Canad. Math. J., 3 (1951), 471-484, where the same concept is labelled as [CG] (for generalized continuity).

External links
A paper which defines class Baire* one

Real analysis
Types of functions